The Conseil des écoles françaises de la communauté urbaine de Toronto, commonly known as CÉFCUT (English: Metropolitan Toronto French School Board), is a former public secular French first language school district. The school board was established in 1988 to manage secular French first language schools in Metropolitan Toronto. It operated until 1998, when CÉFCUT was formally merged with other secular French school boards in the Ontario Peninsula, creating Conseil scolaire Viamonde.

Public separate French schools in Toronto were not managed by CÉFCUT, but Les Conseil des écoles catholiques du Grand Toronto, a board managed by the Metropolitan Separate School Board (MSSB). MSSB controlled the separate French school board until 1998, when the MSSB was reorganized, and its English and French components were split into separate school boards. Separate French first language schools in Toronto are presently managed by the Conseil scolaire catholique MonAvenir.

History
Prior to the establishment of CÉFCUT, several English-language school boards in the Toronto area operated secular Francophone schools with a total of almost 1,700 students; they were the North York Board of Education, Scarborough Board of Education, and Toronto Board of Education. Seven Francophone schools existed in the Toronto area in 1980. The concept of CÉFCUT was developed by a committee assembled by Ontario Minister of Education Sean Conway. CÉFCUT was established on 1 December 1988, and it began operations in 1989.

In 1998, CÉFCUT was merged with several other secular French school boards in the Ontario Peninsula, forming Conseil scolaire Viamonde.

List of schools
The following is a list of schools operated by the school board in 1998, prior to its amalgamation into Conseil scolaire Viamonde:

Elementary

 École élémentaire Félix-Leclerc – Etobicoke
 École élémentaire Jeanne-Lajoie – North York
 École élémentaire Laure-Rièse – Toronto 
 École élémentaire Gabrielle-Roy – Toronto
 École élémentaire Mathieu-Da-Costa – North York

Secondary
 École secondaire Étienne-Brûlé – North York
 Le Collège français à Jarvis – Toronto

See also

 Education in Toronto
 Franco-Ontarian

Notes

References

French-language school districts in Ontario
1988 establishments in Ontario
Educational institutions established in 1988
1998 disestablishments in Ontario
Educational institutions disestablished in 1998
Former school districts in Ontario
Education in Toronto
North York